Roccamandolfi is a comune (municipality) in the Province of Isernia in the Italian region Molise, located about  southwest of Campobasso and about  southeast of Isernia.  
 
Roccamandolfi borders the following municipalities: Cantalupo nel Sannio, Castelpizzuto, Gallo Matese, Letino, Longano, San Gregorio Matese, San Massimo and Santa Maria del Molise.

References

External links

Official website

Cities and towns in Molise